Red Canyon may refer to:

Film
Red Canyon (1949 film), American western
Red Canyon (2008 film), American psychological thriller

Places
Red Canyon (Douglas County, Nevada), U.S.
Red Canyon (Caballo Mountains), New Mexico, U.S.
Red Canyon (Fremont County, Wyoming), U.S.
Red Canyon, in Dixie National Forest, Utah, U.S,
Red Canyon Trail, or New Hance Trail, in Grand Canyon National Park, Arizona, U.S.